Chlorociboria is the type genus of in the fungal family Chlorociboriaceae within order Helotiales. The genus includes 23 species.

Two common temperate zone species, Chlorociboria aeruginascens and Chlorociboria aeruginosa, can only reliably be distinguished by microscopic examination. Chlorociboria aeruginosa has larger spores (9–15 µm × 1.5–2.5 µm) and the worm-like cells of the outer surface are rough, unlike the commoner C. aeruginascens, of which the spores are 6–10 µm × 1.5–2 µm.

The hyphae and fruit bodies of all species make xylindein, a secondary metabolite that stains the substrate wood blue-green, with "green oak" being a valued commodity in woodworking.  The blue-green pigmented wood is featured in Tunbridge ware.

Habit
Blue-green stain is evident year-round, with ascocarp production occurring from summer to fall.

Species
Chlorociboria aeruginascens 
Chlorociboria aeruginosa 
Chlorociboria albohymenia 
Chlorociboria argentinensis 
Chlorociboria awakinoana 
Chlorociboria campbellensis 
Chlorociboria clavula 
Chlorociboria colubrosa 
Chlorociboria duriligna 
Chlorociboria glauca 
Chlorociboria halonata 
Chlorociboria herbicola 
Chlorociboria lamellicola Huhtinen & 
Chlorociboria macrospora 
Chlorociboria musae 
Chlorociboria olivacea 
Chlorociboria omnivirens 
Chlorociboria pardalota 
Chlorociboria poutoensis 
Chlorociboria procera 
Chlorociboria salviicolor 
Chlorociboria spathulata 
Chlorociboria spiralis

See also
 Spalting

References

External links
 Mushroom Expert Chlorociboria aeruginascens
 Article: "Separation of Chlorociboria aeruginascens and C. aeruginosa" from the Warwickshire Fungus Survey

Helotiaceae